Pedro Fernández de Valenzuela (?, Córdoba, Andalusia - ?, Córdoba) was a Spanish conquistador who took part in the expedition of the Spanish conquest of the Muisca led by Gonzalo Jiménez de Quesada from 1536 to 1538. He was the cousin of Hernán Venegas Carrillo and after his journey in the New World returned to Córdoba. He was buried in the church of the former Hospital San Bartolomé de las Bubas in Córdoba.

Biography 
Pedro Fernández de Valenzuela was born in a noble family in an unknown year in Córdoba, Andalusia. He was a cousin of other conquistadors; Hernán Venegas Carrillo, Martín Yañés Tafur and Juan Tafur. Fernández de Valenzuela fought under the Spanish king Carlos II in Italy and gained the title of captain. He left for Santa Marta in the army of Pedro Fernández de Lugo and later accompanied Gonzalo Jiménez de Quesada on the journey towards the Muisca Confederation. De Quesada trusted Fernández de Valenzuela to explore the rich emerald region of Somondoco in 1537 and next year included him in the army to fight the Panche in the Battle of Tocarema. Fernández de Valenzuela accompanied De Quesada and other conquistadors on his journey back to Spain in 1539 and returned to Córdoba. He had a son and daughter; Pedro and Isabel Fernández de Valenzuela.

See also 

List of conquistadors in Colombia
Spanish conquest of the Muisca
El Dorado
Hernán Pérez de Quesada
Gonzalo Jiménez de Quesada

References

Bibliography

Further reading 
 
 
 
 
 
 
 

Year of birth unknown
Year of death unknown
16th-century Spanish people
16th-century explorers
Spanish conquistadors
Andalusian conquistadors
People from Córdoba, Spain
History of the Muisca
History of Colombia